Giovanni Graziano (born 7 November 1995) is an Italian professional footballer who plays as a midfielder for  club Fermana.
It’s the cousin of the footballer Giuseppe Garziano

Club career
Giovanni is a youth exponent of Torino's footballing school, first recruited from the Pulcini of Pro Vercelli in 2005. In 2012–13 he made his debut for the Primavera where, the following year, he was a key player in the side that reached the finals of the Campionato Nazionale Primavera, lost on penalties to Chievo. At the end of the season, he signed his first professional contract with Torino until 2018.

He made his senior debut on 11 December 2014 against Copenhagen in a UEFA Europa League game, replacing Omar El Kaddouri after 66 minutes in a 5–1 away win.

On 15 August 2019, he signed with his childhood club Pro Vercelli.

On 14 January 2021, he joined Fermana on a 2.5-year contract.

Career statistics

Club

Honours

Club
Torino
Campionato Primavera: 2014–15

References

External links
 

1995 births
Living people
People from Vercelli
Footballers from Piedmont
Italian footballers
Association football midfielders
Serie C players
Torino F.C. players
A.C. Renate players
S.S. Teramo Calcio players
A.C. Gozzano players
F.C. Pro Vercelli 1892 players
Fermana F.C. players
Sportspeople from the Province of Vercelli